Eratoidae is a family of predatory sea snails, marine gastropods included in the superfamily Cypraeoidea .

Genera
 Alaerato C. N. Cate, 1977
 Archierato Schilder, 1933 †
 Bellerato Maxwell, 1992 †
 Cypraeerato Schilder, 1933
 Erato Risso, 1826
 Eratoena Iredale, 1935
 Eratopsis R. Hoernes, 1880
 Hespererato Schilder, 1933
 Lachryma Gray, 1832
 Notoficula Thiele, 1917
 Praealaerato Fehse, 2018 †
 Proterato Schilder, 1927
 Sulcerato Finlay, 1930
Synonyms
 Subfamily Eratoinae Gill, 1871 accepted as Eratoidae Gill, 1871
 Tribe Eratotriviini Schilder, 1936 † accepted as Eratoidae Gill, 1871
 Tribe Johnstrupiini Schilder, 1939 † accepted as Eratoidae Gill, 1871
 Genus Proerato [sic] accepted as Proterato Schilder, 1927 (misspelling)

References

 Bouchet P., Rocroi J.P., Hausdorf B., Kaim A., Kano Y., Nützel A., Parkhaev P., Schrödl M. & Strong E.E. (2017). Revised classification, nomenclator and typification of gastropod and monoplacophoran families. Malacologia. 61(1-2): 1-526
 Vaught, K.C.; Tucker Abbott, R.; Boss, K.J. (1989). A classification of the living Mollusca. American Malacologists: Melbourne. . XII, 195 pp.

 
Cypraeoidea